Raker may refer to:

 Raker (surname), a surname
 Raker Qarrigat, a DC Comics alien
 Raker (Transformers), a fictional character
 North Raker, a mountain in Idaho

See also
 Rakers, surname